Andrew Lauder may refer to:
Andrew Lauder (burgess)
Andrew Lauder (music executive)

See also
Andrew Dick-Lauder of the Lauder baronets